Apogee Entertainment, formerly Apogee Software, LLC, is an American video game publisher based in Rowlett, Texas. The company was founded by Terry Nagy in 2008 after he acquired the rights to the name and logo from Scott Miller and his company, 3D Realms, which had used both previously. After reorganizing as Apogee Entertainment in 2021, it hired Miller for its publishing operations.

History 
The original Apogee Software was founded by Scott Miller in 1987 and utilized the Apogee name and logo until 1996, when the company adopted the trade name "3D Realms". In 2008, Terry Nagy, a college friend of Miller, acquired the rights to the "Apogee Software" name and logo, as well as the rights to several games developed under that name, and established a company to publish further titles using the moniker. The publisher's opening was announced at the Electronic Entertainment Expo on July 14, 2008.

The company immediately announced the Duke Nukem Trilogy, three new games in the Duke Nukem series—Critical Mass, Chain Reaction, and Proving Grounds—to be released on Nintendo DS and PlayStation Portable. A co-publishing deal was reached with Deep Silver to ensure wide distribution of the titles. Critical Mass was released for Nintendo DS in May 2011, however, its PlayStation Portable version, as well as Chain Reaction and Proving Grounds, ultimately stayed unreleased. Apogee Software, LLC released Interceptor Entertainment's Rise of the Triad and the Apogee Throwback Pack in July 2013, as well as Radical Heroes: Crimson City Crisis from Mad Unicorn Games in 2016.

During 3D Realms' "Realms Deep 2020" event in September 2020, Apogee Software, LLC announced remastered editions of the original Rise of the Triad (co-published by 3D Realms) and Crystal Caves.

The company announced it was rebranding itself to Apogee Entertainment in April 2021 and focusing solely on indie game publishing. Alongside this announcement, the company announced that they brought on Miller to help assist in publishing efforts.

Games published

Notes

References

External links 
 

2008 establishments in Texas
American companies established in 2008
Companies based in the Dallas–Fort Worth metroplex
Video game companies based in Texas
Privately held companies based in Texas
Rowlett, Texas
Video game companies established in 2008
Video game publishers